

1881–1890 
1885
 Formation of the Association for the Advancement of Physical Education

1891–1900 
1891
 James Naismith, born in Almonte, Ontario, invents basketball while teaching at a school now known as Springfield College

1892
 Senda Berenson reads about Dr. Naismith's new game, and with modified rules, introduces the game to Smith College students.
 First inter-institutional game between the University of California, Berkeley and Miss Head's School.

1893
 Clara Gregory Baer introduces  (as it was written at the time) to Sophie Newcomb College (now part of Tulane University)

1894
 RULE Change—Dribbling and guarding another player prohibited

1895
 Clara Gregory Baer writes the first book of rules for women's basketball.
 The first public women's basketball game in the South is played at a men's only club, the Southern Athletic Club.

1896
 First intercollegiate contest between the University of California, Berkeley and Stanford was held on April 4, 1896. Stanford won, 2–1.

1897
 First recorded women's basketball game in Australia, played in Victoria, using wet paper bags for baskets.
 First women's high school game between Austin High and Oak Park. Won by Austin 16–4.

1899
 Senda Berenson publishes the first issue of Basketball Guide for Women, which she would edit and update for eighteen years. These rules, with minor modifications, would remain in use until the 1960s.
 Stanford abolishes intercollegiate competition of women. (The players formed an independent club team).

1901–1910 
1904
 Stanford rescinds the prohibition against intercollegiate competition of women.
1906

 Women's basketball featured on the cover of the Saturday Evening Post

1911–1920 
1913
 RULE Change—A single dribble is permitted as long as it bounces knee-high

1914
 RULE Change—Half-court play is allowed.

1915
 The Edmonton Grads, then known as the Commercial High School basketball team, won the Intercollegiate Basketball League. They would go on to play as the Grads, with a record of 502–20 between 1915 and 1940. James Naismith would go on to refer to them as  "the finest basketball team that ever stepped out on a floor".

1916
 RULE Change—Coaching from sidelines prohibited during game, except for halftime

1918
 RULE Change—The bottom of the basket is removed. Substitutes allowed for first time (but cannot re-enter game). The bounce pass is allowed

1921–1930 
1921 
 Basketball played for perhaps the first time in Europe at the 1921 Women's Olympiad
1926
 The Amateur Athletic Union sponsored the first-ever American national women's basketball championship.

1927
 RULE Change—Players must wear a number on the back

1931–1940 
1932
 RULE Change—guarding another player first allowed
 FIBA, the International Basketball Federation, is formed in Geneva.

1936

 RULE Change—the first time a guard, called a "rover" was allowed to play the entire court
 The All American Red Heads Team a barnstorming professional team was formed. They would go on to tour the country for 50 years, playing men's team using men's rules.

1938
 RULE Change—The court is now divided into two sections, rather than three. Team size remains six players each.

1941–1950 
1947
 RULE Change—Players must wear a number on the front and the back
1949
 Hazel Walker became the first woman to own a professional basketball team, the Arkansas Travelers.
 RULE Change—Players now allowed a two-bounce dribble. (Continuous dribble used in experimental season, but not adopted)

1951–1960 
1951
 RULE Change—Coaching from sidelines during time outs permitted

1953
 First FIBA World Championship for Women
 Gold—USA
 Silver—Chile
 Bronze—France

1955
 Missouri (Arledge) Morris—named an All-American, the first black AAU All-American
 RULE Change—Three second rule implemented. Players in the offensive lane may not hold the ball for more than three seconds.

1957
 FIBA World Championship for Women
 Gold—USA
 Silver—Soviet Union
 Bronze—Czechoslovakia

1958
 Wayland Baptist won 131 consecutive games, a streak that extends from 1954 to 1958.

1959
 FIBA World Championship for Women
 Gold—Soviet Union
 Silver—Bulgaria
 Bronze—Czechoslovakia

1961–1970 
1962
 First women officials in AAU national tournament—Fran Koening and Carol Walter
 RULE Change—Two "rovers" allowed (players permitted to run the entire court)

1964
 FIBA World Championship for Women
 Gold—Soviet Union
 Silver—Czechoslovakia
 Bronze—Bulgaria

1966
 RULE Change—Continuous dribble allowed

1967
 FIBA World Championship for Women
 Gold—Soviet Union
 Silver—Korea
 Bronze—Czechoslovakia

1968
 RULE Change—Coaching from sidelines during game permitted

1969

 Carol Eckman forms the first National Invitational Women's Intercollegiate Basketball Tournament
 Nera White is named an AAU All-American for the 15th consecutive year.
 West Chester (Pennsylvania) defeated Western Carolina 65–39 in the CIAW invitational tournament

1970
 Cal State-Fullerton defeated West Chester 50–46 in the CIAW invitational tournament

1971–1980 
1971
 FIBA World Championship for Women
 Gold—Soviet Union
 Silver—Czechoslovakia
 Bronze—Brazil

 RULE Change—Full court, five player game instituted for first time for collegiate and AAU games
 The Association for Intercollegiate Athletics for Women(AIAW) formed to govern collegiate women's athletics in the United States and to administer national championships. The transition from the CIAW to the AIAW covered a ten-month period starting in April 1971.
 Mississippi State College for Women defeated West Chester 57–55 in the CIAW invitational tournament

1972
 Title IX signed into law June 23, 1972.
 UBC Thunderbirds won the inaugural Bronze Baby, awarded to the winner of the Canadian Intercollegiate Athletic Union (CIAU; now U Sports) women's basketball tournament.
 Immaculata (Pennsylvania) defeated West Chester 52–48 in the DGWS invitational tournament

1973
 First (partial) scholarships offered to female students
 UBC Thunderbirds won the Bronze Baby, awarded to the CIAU winner in women's basketball
 Immaculata defeated Queens (New York) 59–52 in the AIAW invitational tournament

1974
 First full scholarship offered. The recipient was Ann Meyers who attended UCLA
 UBC Thunderbirds won the Bronze Baby, awarded to the CIAU winner in women's basketball
 Immaculata defeated Mississippi State College for Women 68–53 in the AIAW invitational tournament

1975
 The first nationally televised game is played by Maryland and Immaculata. Some source report that Immaculata won 80–48, while others report 85–63.
 First Kodak All-American team is named.
 FIBA World Championship for Women
 Gold—Soviet Union
 Silver—Japan
 Bronze—Czechoslovakia

 Laurentian Lady Vees won the Bronze Baby, awarded to the CIAU winner in women's basketball
 Delta State (Mississippi) defeated Immaculata 90–81 in the AIAW large college invitational tournament
 Phillips University (Oklahoma) won the AIAW Division II invitational tournament

1976
 First Olympic competition for women
 Gold—Soviet Union
 Silver—USA
 Bronze—Bulgaria

 Laurentian Lady Vees won the Bronze Baby, awarded to the CIAU winner in women's basketball
 Delta State defeated Immaculata 69–64 in the AIAW large college invitational tournament
 Berry College (Georgia) won the AIAW Division II invitational tournament

1977
 Parade Magazine names its first high school All-American team for girls' basketball.  The first team includes future Women's Basketball Hall of Fame members Denise Curry, Cindy Noble and Lynette Woodard.
 First Broderick Cup awarded to "the best athlete in each sport". The first recipient was Lusia Harris.
 Laurentian Lady Vees won the Bronze Baby, awarded to the CIAU winner in women's basketball
 Delta State defeated LSU 68–55 in the AIAW large college invitational tournament
 Southeastern Louisiana won the AIAW Division II invitational tournament

1978
 The Women's Professional Basketball League formed, the first professional women's basketball league in the United States. It lasted until 1981.
 First Wade Trophy awarded to the best women's basketball player in National Collegiate Athletic Association (NCAA) Division I competition The first recipient was Carol Blazejowski.
 Laurentian Lady Vees won the Bronze Baby, awarded to the CIAU winner in women's basketball
 UCLA defeated Maryland 90–74 in the AIAW large college invitational tournament
 High Point (North Carolina) won the AIAW Division II invitational tournament

1979
 FIBA World Championship for Women
 Gold—USA
 Silver—Korea
 Bronze—Canada

 Laurentian Lady Vees won the Bronze Baby, awarded to the Canadian Interuniversity Sport (CIS; now U Sports) winner in women's basketball
 Old Dominion defeated Louisiana Tech 75–65 in the AIAW large college invitational tournament
 South Carolina State won the AIAW Division II invitational tournament

1980
 Olympic competition for women
 Gold—Soviet Union
 Silver—Bulgaria
 Bronze—Yugoslavia

 Victoria Vikes won the Bronze Baby, awarded to the CIS winner in women's basketball
 Australian Institute of Sport (AIS) established, with responsibility for eight sports including basketball
 Old Dominion defeated Tennessee 68–53 in the AIAW Division I invitational tournament
 University of Dayton won the AIAW Division II invitational tournament
 Worcester State College (Massachusetts) won the AIAW Division III invitational tournament

1981–1990 
1981
 The Women's Basketball Coaches Association (WBCA), an association of coaches of women's basketball teams at all levels, is formed.
 Victoria Vikes won the Bronze Baby, awarded to the Canadian Interuniversity Sport winner in women's basketball
 Louisiana Tech defeated Tennessee 79–59 in the AIAW Division I invitational tournament
 William Penn College (Iowa) won the AIAW Division II invitational tournament
 Wisconsin–La Crosse won the AIAW Division III invitational tournament
 Inaugural season of the Australian Women's National Basketball League
 St Kilda Saints won the Australian Women's National Basketball League Championship

1982

 Louisiana Tech (35-1) won the first NCAA Division I women's basketball tournament
 Cal Poly Pomona (29-7) won the first NCAA Women's Division II Basketball Championship
 Elizabethtown (26-1) won the first NCAA Women's Division III Basketball Championship
 Victoria Vikes won the Bronze Baby, awarded to the Canadian Interuniversity Sport winner in women's basketball
 Rutgers defeated Texas 83–77 in the final AIAW Division I invitational tournament
 Francis Marion College (South Carolina) won the AIAW Division II invitational tournament
 Concordia College (Minnesota) won the AIAW Division III invitational tournament
 St Kilda Saints won the Australian Women's National Basketball League Championship

1983
 USC (31-2) won the NCAA Division I women's basketball tournament
 Virginia Union (27-2) won the NCAA Women's Division II Basketball Championship
 North Central (Ill.) (26-6) won the NCAA Women's Division III Basketball Championship
 Bishop's Gaiters won the Bronze Baby, awarded to the Canadian Interuniversity Sport winner in women's basketball
 Nunawading Spectres won the Australian Women's National Basketball League Championship
 FIBA World Championship for Women
 Gold—Soviet Union
 Silver—USA
 Bronze—Chile

1984
 RULE Change—The ball circumference for NCAA play is reduced by one inch (to 28.5–29 inches) compared to the ball used previously, and used by men. This size ball is also called size 6.
 Olympic competition for women
 Gold—USA
 Silver—Korea
 Bronze—China

 West Virginia's Georgeann Wells became the first woman to register a dunk in an official NCAA intercollegiate basketball game.
 USC (29-4) won the NCAA Division I women's basketball tournament
 Central Missouri (27-5) won the NCAA Women's Division II Basketball Championship
 Rust (26-5) won the NCAA Women's Division III Basketball Championship
 Bishop's Gaiters won the Bronze Baby, awarded to the Canadian Interuniversity Sport winner in women's basketball
 Nunawading Spectres won the Australian Women's National Basketball League Championship

1985
 Lynette Woodard becomes the first woman to play for the Harlem Globetrotters.
 Old Dominion (31-3) won the NCAA Division I women's basketball tournament
 Cal Poly Pomona (26-7) won the NCAA Women's Division II Basketball Championship
 Scranton (31-1) won the NCAA Women's Division III Basketball Championship
 Victoria Vikes won the Bronze Baby, awarded to the Canadian Interuniversity Sport winner in women's basketball
 Coburg Cougars won the Australian Women's National Basketball League Championship

1986

 Texas (34-0) won the NCAA Division I women's basketball tournament, completing the first undefeated season in NCAA Division I history.
 Cal Poly Pomona (30-3) won the NCAA Women's Division II Basketball Championship
 Salem State (29-1) won the NCAA Women's Division III Basketball Championship
 Toronto Varsity Blues won the Bronze Baby, awarded to the Canadian Interuniversity Sport winner in women's basketball
 Nunawading Spectres won the Australian Women's National Basketball League Championship
 RULE Change—The alternating possession arrow is first used, although a jump ball is still used at the beginning of the game, and the beginning of overtime. Coaches must stay within coaching box, and only the head coach may stand while the ball is live
 FIBA World Championship for Women
 Gold—USA
 Silver—Soviet Union
 Bronze—Canada

1987
 RULE Change—The three-point field goal is introduced for any field goal completed when shot beyond a line set at 19 feet, and 9 inches from the center of the basket.
 Tennessee (28-6) won the NCAA Division I women's basketball tournament
 New Haven (29-2) won the NCAA Women's Division II Basketball Championship
 Wisconsin–Stevens Point (27-2) won the NCAA Women's Division III Basketball Championship
 Victoria Vikes won the Bronze Baby, awarded to the Canadian Interuniversity Sport winner in women's basketball
 Nunawading Spectres won the Australian Women's National Basketball League Championship

1988
 Olympic competition for women
 Gold—USA
 Silver—Yugoslavia
 Bronze—Soviet Union

 Louisiana Tech (32-2) won the NCAA Division I women's basketball tournament
 Hampton (33-1) won the NCAA Women's Division II Basketball Championship
 Concordia-Moorhead (29-2) won the NCAA Women's Division III Basketball Championship
 Manitoba Bisons won the Bronze Baby, awarded to the Canadian Interuniversity Sport winner in women's basketball
 Nunawading Spectres won the Australian Women's National Basketball League Championship

1989
 Tennessee (35-2) won the NCAA Division I women's basketball tournament
 Delta State (30-4) won the NCAA Women's Division II Basketball Championship
 Elizabethtown (29-2) won the NCAA Women's Division III Basketball Championship
 Calgary Dinos won the Bronze Baby, awarded to the Canadian Interuniversity Sport winner in women's basketball
 Nunawading Spectres won the Australian Women's National Basketball League Championship

1990

 Stanford (32-1) won the NCAA Division I women's basketball tournament
 Delta State (32-1) won the NCAA Women's Division II Basketball Championship
 Hope (24-2) won the NCAA Women's Division III Basketball Championship
 Laurentian Lady Vees won the Bronze Baby, awarded to the Canadian Interuniversity Sport winner in women's basketball
 North Adelaide Rockets won the Australian Women's National Basketball League Championship
 FIBA World Championship for Women
 Gold—USA
 Silver—Yugoslavia
 Bronze—Cuba

1991–2000 
1991
 Tennessee (30-5) won the NCAA Division I women's basketball tournament
 North Dakota State (31-2) won the NCAA Women's Division II Basketball Championship
 St. Thomas (MN) (29-2) won the NCAA Women's Division III Basketball Championship
 Laurentian Lady Vees won the Bronze Baby, awarded to the Canadian Interuniversity Sport winner in women's basketball
 Hobart Islanders won the Australian Women's National Basketball League Championship

1992
 Olympic competition for women
 Gold—Com. of Independent States(CIS)
 Silver—China
 Bronze—USA

 Stanford (30-3) won the NCAA Division I women's basketball tournament
 Delta State (30-4) won the NCAA Women's Division II Basketball Championship
 Alma (24-3) won the NCAA Women's Division III Basketball Championship
 Victoria Vikes won the Bronze Baby, awarded to the Canadian Interuniversity Sport winner in women's basketball
 Perth Breakers won the Australian Women's National Basketball League Championship

1993
 Texas Tech (31-3) won the NCAA Division I women's basketball tournament
 North Dakota State (30-2) won the NCAA Women's Division II Basketball Championship
 Central (IA) (24-5) won the NCAA Women's Division III Basketball Championship
 Winnipeg Wesmen won the Bronze Baby, awarded to the Canadian Interuniversity Sport winner in women's basketball
 Sydney Flames won the Australian Women's National Basketball League Championship
 The WBA (Women's Basketball Association) plays its first official game on its way to three seasons of Women's Professional Basketball.

1994
 FIBA World Championship for Women
 Gold—Brazil
 Silver—China
 Bronze—Cuba

 North Carolina (33-2) won the NCAA Division I women's basketball tournament
 North Dakota State (27-5) won the NCAA Women's Division II Basketball Championship
 Capital (30-1) won the NCAA Women's Division III Basketball Championship
 Winnipeg Wesmen won the Bronze Baby, awarded to the Canadian Interuniversity Sport winner in women's basketball
 Adelaide Lightning won the Australian Women's National Basketball League Championship

1995
 Connecticut (35-0) won the NCAA Division I women's basketball tournament
 North Dakota State (32-0) won the NCAA Women's Division II Basketball Championship
 Capital (33-0) won the NCAA Women's Division III Basketball Championship
 Winnipeg Wesmen won the Bronze Baby, awarded to the Canadian Interuniversity Sport winner in women's basketball
 Adelaide Lightning won the Australian Women's National Basketball League Championship

1996
 Olympic competition for women
 Gold—USA
 Silver—Brazil
 Bronze—Australia

 Tennessee (32-4) won the NCAA Division I women's basketball tournament
 North Dakota State (30-2) won the NCAA Women's Division II Basketball Championship
 Wisconsin-Oshkosh (31-0) won the NCAA Women's Division III Basketball Championship
 Manitoba Bisons won the Bronze Baby, awarded to the Canadian Interuniversity Sport winner in women's basketball
 Adelaide Lightning won the Australian Women's National Basketball League Championship
 The WNBA is founded, with eight initial teams. Sheryl Swoopes is the first player signed.
 The American Basketball League (ABL) formed, a professional basketball league for women in the United States. It lasted two full seasons, and suspended operations in the third.

1997

 Tennessee (29-10) won the NCAA Division I women's basketball tournament
 North Dakota (28-4) won the NCAA Women's Division II Basketball Championship
 NYU (29-1) won the NCAA Women's Division III Basketball Championship
 Manitoba Bisons won the Bronze Baby, awarded to the Canadian Interuniversity Sport winner in women's basketball
 Sydney Flames won the Australian Women's National Basketball League Championship
 First WNBA draft, with Tina Thompson as the first player selected. The first game is held on 21 June 1997, between the New York Liberty and the Los Angeles Sparks. The Liberty won 67–57.
 The Houston Comets win the first WNBA Championship.
 Trent Tucker Rule adopted by WNBA.
1998
 Tennessee (39-0) won the NCAA Division I women's basketball tournament
 North Dakota (31-1) won the NCAA Women's Division II Basketball Championship
 Washington (MO) (28-2) won the NCAA Women's Division III Basketball Championship
 Victoria Vikes won the Bronze Baby, awarded to the Canadian Interuniversity Sport winner in women's basketball
 Adelaide Lightning won the Australian Women's National Basketball League Championship
 FIBA World Championship for Women
 Gold—USA
 Silver—Russia
 Bronze—Australia
 The Houston Comets won the WNBA Championship.

1999
 Purdue (34-1) won the NCAA Division I women's basketball tournament
 North Dakota (31-1) won the NCAA Women's Division II Basketball Championship
 Washington (MO) (30-0) won the NCAA Women's Division III Basketball Championship
 Alberta Pandas won the Bronze Baby, awarded to the Canadian Interuniversity Sport winner in women's basketball
 Australian Institute of Sport won the Australian Women's National Basketball League Championship
 The Houston Comets won the WNBA Championship.

2000
 Olympic competition for women
 Gold—USA
 Silver—Australia
 Bronze—Brazil

 Connecticut (36-1) won the NCAA Division I women's basketball tournament
 Northern Kentucky (32-2) won the NCAA Women's Division II Basketball Championship
 Washington (MO) (30-0) won the NCAA Women's Division III Basketball Championship
 Victoria Vikes won the Bronze Baby, awarded to the Canadian Interuniversity Sport winner in women's basketball
 Canberra Capitals won the Australian Women's National Basketball League Championship
 First outdoor college basketball game: Tennessee defeats Arizona 67–63
 The Houston Comets won the WNBA Championship.

2001–2010 
2001
 Notre Dame (34-2) won the NCAA Division I women's basketball tournament
 Cal Poly Pomona (27-3) won the NCAA Women's Division II Basketball Championship
 Washington (MO) (28-2) won the NCAA Women's Division III Basketball Championship
 Regina Cougars won the Bronze Baby, awarded to the Canadian Interuniversity Sport winner in women's basketball
 Sydney Panthers won the Australian Women's National Basketball League Championship
 The LA Sparks won the WNBA Championship.

2002
 FIBA World Championship for Women
 Gold—USA
 Silver—Russia
 Bronze—Australia

 Connecticut (39-0) won the NCAA Division I women's basketball tournament
 Cal Poly Pomona (28-4) won the NCAA Women's Division II Basketball Championship
 Wisconsin-Stevens Point (30–3) won the NCAA Women's Division III Basketball Championship
 Simon Fraser Clan won the Bronze Baby, awarded to the Canadian Interuniversity Sport winner in women's basketball
 Canberra Capitals won the Australian Women's National Basketball League Championship
 The first McDonald's All-American Game for girls is played at Madison Square Garden in New York City.
 The Los Angeles Sparks won the WNBA Championship.

2003
 Connecticut (37-1) won the NCAA Division I women's basketball tournament
 South Dakota State (32-3) won the NCAA Women's Division II Basketball Championship
 Trinity (Texas) (28-5) won the NCAA Women's Division III Basketball Championship
 Victoria Vikes won the Bronze Baby, awarded to the Canadian Interuniversity Sport winner in women's basketball
 Canberra Capitals won the Australian Women's National Basketball League Championship
 The Detroit Shock won the WNBA Championship.

2004
 Olympic competition for women
 Gold—USA
 Silver—Australia
 Bronze—Russia

 Connecticut (31-4) won the NCAA Division I women's basketball tournament
 California (PA) (35-1) won the NCAA Women's Division II Basketball Championship
 Wilmington (Ohio) (27-6) won the NCAA Women's Division III Basketball Championship
 UBC Thunderbirds won the Bronze Baby, awarded to the Canadian Interuniversity Sport winner in women's basketball
 Dandenong Rangers won the Australian Women's National Basketball League Championship
 The Seattle Storm won the WNBA Championship.

2005
 Baylor (33-3) won the NCAA Division I women's basketball tournament
 Washburn (35-2) won the NCAA Women's Division II Basketball Championship
 Millikin (29-2) won the NCAA Women's Division III Basketball Championship
 Simon Fraser Clan won the Bronze Baby, awarded to the Canadian Interuniversity Sport winner in women's basketball
 Dandenong Rangers won the Australian Women's National Basketball League Championship
 The Sacramento Monarchs won the WNBA Championship.

2006

 FIBA World Championship for Women
 Gold—Australia
 Silver—Russia
 Bronze—USA

 Maryland (34-4) won the NCAA Division I women's basketball tournament
 Grand Valley State (33-3) won the NCAA Women's Division II Basketball Championship
 Hope (33-1) won the NCAA Women's Division III Basketball Championship
 UBC Thunderbirds won the Bronze Baby, awarded to the Canadian Interuniversity Sport winner in women's basketball
 Canberra Capitals won the Australian Women's National Basketball League Championship
 The Detroit Shock won the WNBA Championship.

2007
 Tennessee (34-3) won the NCAA Division I women's basketball tournament
 Southern Connecticut State (34-2) won the NCAA Women's Division II Basketball Championship
 DePauw (31-3) won the NCAA Women's Division III Basketball Championship
 Simon Fraser Clan won the Bronze Baby, awarded to the Canadian Interuniversity Sport winner in women's basketball
 Canberra Capitals won the Australian Women's National Basketball League Championship
 The Phoenix Mercury won the WNBA Championship.

2008
 Olympic competition for women
 Gold—USA
 Silver—Australia
 Bronze—Russia

 Tennessee (36-2) won the NCAA Division I women's basketball tournament
 Northern Kentucky (28-8) won the NCAA Women's Division II Basketball Championship
 Howard Payne (33-0) won the NCAA Women's Division III Basketball Championship
 UBC Thunderbirds won the Bronze Baby, awarded to the Canadian Interuniversity Sport winner in women's basketball
 Adelaide Lightning won the Australian Women's National Basketball League Championship
 The Detroit Shock won the WNBA Championship.

2009

 Connecticut (39-0) won the NCAA Division I women's basketball tournament
 Minnesota State Mankato (32-2) won the NCAA Women's Division II Basketball Championship
 George Fox (32-0) won the NCAA Women's Division III Basketball Championship
 Simon Fraser Clan won the Bronze Baby, awarded to the Canadian Interuniversity Sport winner in women's basketball
 Canberra Capitals won the Australian Women's National Basketball League Championship
 The Phoenix Mercury won the WNBA Championship.

2010
 FIBA World Championship for Women
 Gold—USA
 Silver—Czech Republic
 Bronze—Spain

 Trent Tucker Rule was adopted for FIBA women's play. 
 Connecticut (39-0) won the NCAA Division I women's basketball tournament
 Connecticut had their 89th consecutive victory, one more than the all-time NCAA men's wins record of 88 held by UCLA; the streak ended at 90 wins.
 Emporia State (30-5) won the NCAA Women's Division II Basketball Championship
 Washington (MO) (29-2) won the NCAA Women's Division III Basketball Championship
 Simon Fraser Clan won the Bronze Baby, awarded to the Canadian Interuniversity Sport winner in women's basketball
 Canberra Capitals won the Australian Women's National Basketball League Championship
 The Seattle Storm won the WNBA Championship.

2011–2020 
2011
 Texas A&M (33-5) won the NCAA Division I women's basketball tournament
 Clayton State (35-1) won the NCAA Women's Division II Basketball Championship
 Amherst (32-1) won the NCAA Women's Division III Basketball Championship
 Windsor Lancers won the Bronze Baby, awarded to the Canadian Interuniversity Sport winner in women's basketball
 Bulleen Boomers won the Australian Women's National Basketball League Championship
 The story of the first of three consecutive AIAW national championship by Immaculata is made into a movie, released in 2011: The Mighty Macs
 The Minnesota Lynx won the WNBA Championship.

2012
 Olympic competition for women
 Gold—USA
 Silver—France
 Bronze—Australia

 Baylor (40-0) won the NCAA Division I women's basketball tournament
 Shaw (29-6) won the NCAA Women's Division II Basketball Championship
 Illinois Wesleyan (28-5) won the NCAA Women's Division III Basketball Championship
 Windsor Lancers won the Bronze Baby, awarded to the CIS women's basketball champion.
Dandenong Rangers won the Australian Women's National Basketball League Championship
 The Indiana Fever won the WNBA Championship.
 First women's game played on an aircraft carrier.

2013
 Connecticut (35–4) won the NCAA Division I women's basketball tournament
 Ashland (38–1) won the NCAA Women's Division II Basketball Championship
 DePauw (35–0) won the NCAA Women's Division III Basketball Championship
 Windsor Lancers won the Bronze Baby, awarded to the Canadian Interuniversity Sport winner in women's basketball
 Bendigo Spirit won the Australian Women's National Basketball League Championship
 Before the start of the 2013–14 season, the NCAA adopts the 10-second backcourt limit for the first time. Prior to this change, NCAA women's basketball was the only level of basketball in the world that did not have a backcourt possession time limit.
 The Minnesota Lynx won the WNBA Championship.

2014
FIBA World Championship for Women
 Gold—USA
 Silver—Spain
 Bronze—Australia
This was the last event known as the "FIBA World Championship for Women". Shortly after the 2014 edition, the competition was renamed the FIBA Women's Basketball World Cup.
 Connecticut (40–0) won the NCAA Division I women's basketball tournament
 Bentley (35–0) won the NCAA Women's Division II Basketball Championship.
 Fairleigh Dickinson-Florham (33–0) won the NCAA Women's Division III Basketball Championship
 Windsor Lancers won the Bronze Baby, awarded to the Canadian Interuniversity Sport winner in women's basketball
Bendigo Spirit won the Australian Women's National Basketball League Championship
 On August 5, Becky Hammon, set to retire at the end of the 2014 WNBA season as a player with the San Antonio Stars, is hired as an assistant by the city's NBA team, the Spurs, effective with her retirement from play. Hammon is the first woman to be hired as a full-time coach in any of North America's four major professional leagues.
 The Phoenix Mercury won the WNBA Championship.

2015
 Connecticut (38–1) won the NCAA Division I women's basketball tournament
 California (PA) (32–4) won the NCAA Women's Division II Basketball Championship.
 Thomas More (33–0) won the NCAA Women's Division III Basketball Championship
 Windsor Lancers won the Bronze Baby, awarded to the Canadian Interuniversity Sport winner in women's basketball
Townsville Fire won the Australian Women's National Basketball League Championship
 Effective with the 2015–16 season, the NCAA changed women's basketball from 20-minute halves to 10-minute quarters.
 Canada wins the gold medal at the 2015 Pan American Games
 The Minnesota Lynx won the 2015 WNBA finals

2016
 Olympic competition for women
 Gold—USA
 Silver—Spain
 Bronze—Serbia
The University of Saskatchewan Huskies  (18–2) won the Bronze Baby, awarded to the Canadian Interuniversity Sport winner in women's basketball.
The WNBL switches from a single game to a best of 3 finals
Townsville Fire won the Australian Women's National Basketball League Championship
 With their eleventh championship win in 2016, the UConn Huskies (38–0) passed the UCLA Bruins men's team for most college basketball championships, and became the first Division 1 women's basketball team to win four straight national championships.
 Breanna Stewart was named the AP Player Of The Year (making her the first female college basketball player to win that award three times)
 Breanna Stewart was named the Most Outstanding Player of the Final Four (making her the first person to be most outstanding player of the Final Four four times)
 Lubbock Christian University (35–0) won the NCAA Division II Women's Basketball Championship
 Thomas More (33–0) won the NCAA Women's Division III Basketball Championship
 The Los Angeles Sparks won the WNBA Championship.

2017
 The Connecticut Huskies women's basketball team obtained the longest winning streak in college basketball (both men's and women's), 111 straight wins, which started with a win against Creighton on December 23, 2014, and continued for 111 games until March 31, 2017, when they were beaten 66–64 on a last second shot in overtime by Mississippi State in the 2017 NCAA Final Four. This streak included an undefeated season in 2015–16. 
 McGill University (25–9) won the Bronze Baby, awarded to the women's basketball champion of the newly renamed U Sports.
Sydney Uni Flames won the Australian Women's National Basketball League Championship
 South Carolina (33–4) won the NCAA Division I women's basketball tournament
 Ashland (37–0) won the NCAA Women's Division II Basketball Championship
 Amherst (33–0) won the NCAA Women's Division III Basketball Championship
 The Minnesota Lynx won the WNBA Championship.

2018
 Carleton won the Bronze Baby, awarded to the U Sports women's basketball champion.
Townsville Fire won the Australian Women's National Basketball League Championship
 Notre Dame (35-3) won the NCAA Women's Division I Basketball Championship
 Central Missouri (30–3) won the NCAA Women's Division II Basketball Championship
 Amherst (33–0) won the NCAA Women's Division III Basketball Championship
 The Seattle Storm won the WNBA Championship.

2019
 McMaster won the Bronze Baby, awarded to the U Sports women's basketball champion.
UC Capitals won the Australian Women's National Basketball League Championship
Baylor (37–1) won the NCAA Division I women's basketball tournament
Lubbock Christian (32–5) won the NCAA Women's Division II Basketball Championship.
 Thomas More (33–0) won the NCAA Women's Division III Basketball Championship.
 The Washington Mystics won the WNBA Championship.

2020

 Saskatchewan won the Bronze Baby, awarded to the U Sports women's basketball champion.
UC Capitals won the Australian Women's National Basketball League Championship
NCAA Div I, II and III post-season tournaments cancelled due to COVID-19
 After Gregg Popovich was ejected in the second quarter in the Spurs' 121–107 loss to the Los Angeles Lakers on December 30, 2020, Hammon became the first female acting head coach in NBA history.

2021–2030 
2021
 The first WNBA Commissioner's Cup, delayed from its originally planned 2020 launch due to COVID-19 issues, was held, with the Seattle Storm defeating the Connecticut Sun in the Cup final in Phoenix.
 The Bronze Baby championship was not held due to COVID-19 issues.
 Stanford (31–2) won the NCAA Division I women's basketball tournament
 Lubbock Christian (23–0) won the NCAA Women's Division II Basketball Championship.
The NCAA Division III championship was canceled.

2022
 The Mexican women's professional league (Liga Nacional de Baloncesto Profesional Femenil) was formed and played its first matches on 23 April
 NCAA championships:
 Division I: South Carolina defeated UConn 64–49 in the championship game.
 Division I: Glenville State defeated Western Washington 85–72 in the championship game.
 In the first Division III tournament since 2019, Hope defeated Wisconsin–Whitewater 71–58 in the championship game.

See also 
 Basketball
 History of basketball
 Saskatchewan Huskies
 Timeline of women's sports
 Women's basketball

Notes

References 
 
 
 
 
 
 
 
 
 

Berenson, Senda (1901). Basket Ball for Women. New York: American Sports Publishing Company. at Internet Archive

Women in sports
Women's basketball
basketball
History of basketball